Krang (also spelled Kraang) is a fictional supervillain appearing in Teenage Mutant Ninja Turtles-related media, most frequently in the 1987 animated series and its associated merchandise, such as the Teenage Mutant Ninja Turtles Adventures comic book and most of the classic TMNT video games.

Krang's first comics appearance was in Teenage Mutant Ninja Turtles Adventures vol. 1, #1, published by Archie Comics in August 1988. In the 1987 TV series, Krang was voiced by Pat Fraley. He is still one of the primary antagonists to the Ninja Turtles, appearing as General Krang in the 2012 IDW comic publication. The character made his first live action appearance in the 2016 sequel, Teenage Mutant Ninja Turtles: Out of the Shadows, with his voice provided by Brad Garrett.

Krang was created by David Wise, with inspirations from the Utroms, to supply the Shredder with extraterrestrial technology.

In the 2012 series, Krang is referred to as Kraang Prime, and is the leader of a rogue hive mind faction of Utroms known as "the Kraang".

In Rise of the TMNT: The Movie, Krang is referred to as Krang Leader (credited as Krang One), who leads his siblings, Krang Sister (credited as Krang Two) and Krang Brother (credited as Krang Three).

Abilities 
In the final season of the 1987 animated series, Krang showed signs of psychic powers when he hypnotized one of Lord Dregg's soldiers into obeying his and Shredder's commands, saying it would only work on weak-willed people.

Relating to the Utroms 
Krang's physical appearance was inspired by the Utroms from the original TMNT comic book.

1987 series 

Prior to the start of the 1987 cartoon, Krang was a reptilian creature in command of an army of Rock Soldiers under the leadership of General Traag, and took the completed Technodrome, a powerful mobile battle fortress, and banished Von Drakus, who helped Krang build it, to Earth. When he was banished from Dimension X, Krang was stripped of his body and reduced to a brain-like form.

While on Earth, Krang allied himself with the Shredder, who, along with his robotic Foot Soldier army, moved into the Technodrome. In exchange, the Shredder had to design and build a new body for Krang, a human-shaped exo-suit. Shredder lived up to his part of the bargain in the season 1 episode "Shredder was Splintered", in no small part because he was unable to deal with the Turtles and needed Krang's help. In the season 3 episode "Shredderville", the Turtles have a dream of a parallel world in which they never lived, and Shredder had no problem taking over the world; in that world, Shredder abandoned Krang after his conquest was complete, leaving him with no body and a heavily-damaged Technodrome.

Krang's ultimate goal is to take over the Earth; it probably only became his objective after he was exiled on the Earth, but this point is never made clear. Every plan Krang conceives is either aimed at that goal, or towards the short-term objective of powering-up the Technodrome. He does not share Shredder's obsession with the Turtles and Splinter; while Shredder sees them as mortal enemies, Krang seems to regard them more like annoyances to be destroyed when they interfere in his plans.

Counting from the first meeting between the Turtles and Shredder and Krang, Krang spent seven seasons in the Technodrome, either somewhere on Earth or in Dimension X, scheming to power up his battle fortress and take over the Earth. Eventually the Turtles managed to banish the Technodrome back to Dimension X without Krang and Shredder. At that point they began operating out of an old science building. Krang and Shredder eventually returned to the Technodrome in the season 8 episode Turtle Trek, but the Turtles destroy the engines of the Technodrome, trapping it and its inhabitants in Dimension X and putting an end to Krang's plans. 

Krang spent the next two years in Dimension X, until he was contacted by Dregg. Dregg arranged for him and Shredder to come back to Earth, to help him fight the Turtles. However, Dregg betrays them, and drains Krang's intelligence. Shredder escapes and restores Krang, but Dregg captures them again. Finally, the Turtles spoil his plan and transport Shredder and Krang back to Dimension X.

In the series finale, Divide and Conquer, the Turtles return to the Technodrome to take Krang's android body, which they need to fight Dregg. Krang is nowhere to be seen, but it is assumed that he is still somewhere in Dimension X.

IDW Comics
In the IDW Comics Krang is both an Utrom and a denizen of Dimension X. He is the heir of Quanin, the former Prime Minister of the Utroms' ruling council who appointed himself Emperor and aggressively expanded the Utrom domain into an empire. However, his megalomanic expansion drive both deprived his home planet of its most essential natural resource, the Ooze, and incited rebellion among the subjugated people of Dimension X, eventually leading to the destruction of Utrominon. Krang, who was as brutal as his father but opposed his uncautious politics, fled with a few survivors of his people through an interdimensional portal to Burnow Island on Earth, where he established a base from which he intended to terraform this world into a new home for his people.

In order to augment his troops, Krang, initially disguised as a despotic human warlord, forms a business relationship with Baxter Stockman, head of the genetics research institute Stock Gen, and supplies him with Ooze, which could be used as a natural mutagen on Earth's organisms. It is through Stockman's experiments that the Teenage Mutant Ninja Turtles and Splinter evolve into intelligent, humanoid mutants. When the Turtles learn of Krang's genocidal plans thanks to their human friend April O'Neil, a former intern at Stock Gen, they, together with their ally, the Fugitoid (a former Neutrino scientist whose mind is trapped in a robot body and who was forcibly conscripted by Krang to complete his terraforming machine, the Technodrome), and the Foot Clan stop Krang from destroying the Earth, and the Utrom warlord is surrendered to the Neutrinos for trial for his numerous war crimes.

While imprisoned on Neutrino, Kraang hires the bounty hunter Hakk-R to eliminate several material witnesses in order to get the trial cancelled, but Hakk-R fails thanks to the efforts of the Turtles. Eventually, Krang is found guilty and sentenced to permanent exile from Dimension X on Earth. However, Leatherhead, one of his former victims and a key witness in the trial, refuses to accept the mild verdict and kills Krang by devouring him. However, as the Fugitoid belatedly realizes, the Utroms possess a natural parasitic physiology, enabling Krang to regenerate himself and take possession of Leatherhead's body.

2003 series
Krang makes a small cameo appearance in the episode "Secret Origins Part 3" of the 2003 series. As the Utroms are all walking to the transmat to go back home one of them complains, "I hate walking on my tentacles," to which another Utrom replies, "Oh, shut up, Krang!". This Krang was voiced by Wayne Grayson.

Krang also appears in the 2009 crossover film, Turtles Forever, in which he, Shredder and the Turtles from the 1987 show end up in the 2003 universe. Although Shredder was able to find his 2003 counterpart, he was unable to find Krang's, even though he exists in this universe (albeit as a regular, non-evil Utrom). Krang is voiced here by Bradford Cameron.

2012 series
An alien species based on both Krang and the Utroms appear in the 2012 Nickelodeon show, named The Kraang. Kraang Prime is the leader of the hive mind and was a normal Utrom scientist until he made the mutagen, which he used to mutate himself into Kraang Prime. He then used his powers to enslave most of the Utroms into becoming hive mind slaves.

Given the series introduces the 1987 show as an alternate universe, the original Krang makes an appearance, still voiced by Pat Fraley, being said to be a cousin of Kraang Sub-Prime that wound up exiled to that dimension because he was a screw-up. He attempted to destroy the Mirage, 1987 and 2012 universes, the latter of which the Kraang had especially been trying to conquer, using Sub-Prime's desire to "wipe out the Turtles at any cost" as leverage. Sub-Prime banishes him back to the 1987-universe once this is revealed, as this incompetence was why Krang was banished in the first place.

2018 series

In the series Rise of the Teenage Mutant Ninja Turtles and its Neflix film sequel Rise of the Teenage Mutant Ninja Turtles: The Movie, the Krang is an alien species that landed on ancient Earth bringing with them a mutagen known as Empyrean, which created the Yōkai race. During feudal times in Japan, the Krang gifted Oroku Saki, leader of the Foot Clan, with the dark armor Kuroi Yōroi, which allowed Saki to defeat the Foot's enemies, but ended up possessing and transforming him into the evil Shredder and leading the Foot clan into worshiping them. Eventually a group of warriors who created the mystic weapon key and used it to banish them into another realm for a thousand years. During the series finale, Shredder unearths the remains of a Krang inside a buried ship while looking for Empyrean to fulfill his goals. By the time the Foot opens the portal to set them free, only three of them have survived their exile, they then possess the members of the Foot Clan and turn them into monstrous minions (with the same fate later befalling Raph, until Leo snaps him out of it) and proceed to take over the highest building of the city in order to open a portal big enough for their ship Technodrome to crossover.

Unlike the previous versions of the Krang who mostly relied on their intellect, this version is more powerful and deadly and is capable of fighting without the use of any kind of tech and are virtually unstoppable in their suits. Their method of mutation also greatly differs from prior incarnations in that they utilise a form of bio-growth that usually takes over or otherwise transmutates anything it touches, even puppeteering inorganic matter. Their members include the mastermind behind their plan who leads the other two, a female Krang who leads the possessed slaves into battle and has a temper, and a silent one who is in charge of spreading the bio-growth, creating the portal and piloting the Technodrome (Which in this series is techno-organic). The female one lost her right eye at the hands of April and was defeated by her, Splinter and Casey Jones and later captured by humans, the silent one was restrained by Donatello when he seized control of Technodrome and presumably destroyed with the ship and the leader was exiled again at the hands of Leonardo.

Krang Leader is voiced by Jim Pirri and Krang Sister is voiced by Toks Olagundoye.

Film
Brad Garrett voices Krang in Teenage Mutant Ninja Turtles: Out of the Shadows, where it was the first official live-action appearance of the character. Fred Armisen was originally going to voice the character, but scheduling conflicts made Armisen unavailable.

References

External links
 Kranag's profile at the Nickelodeon website 
 Krang's Android Body on X-Entertainment. 
 Krang - A Tribute on The Rubber Chicken. 

Teenage Mutant Ninja Turtles characters
Villains in animated television series
Comics characters introduced in 1988
Cyborgs in fiction
Extraterrestrial supervillains
Fictional dictators
Fictional reptilians
Fictional warlords
Male characters in animation
Male characters in comics
Television characters introduced in 1987
Television supervillains
Video game bosses
Film supervillains